Livadi or Leivadi is a village and a former municipality in the Larissa regional unit, Thessaly, Greece. Since the 2011 local government reform it is part of the municipality Elassona, of which it is a municipal unit. 

In the Ottoman tahrir defteri of 1521, the settlement is recorded as a village with the name . The village was founded by Aromanian-speaking agricultural and livestock farmers. Before the 2011 local government reform it was an independent municipality. The 2011 census recorded 2,674 residents in the municipal unit and 2,244 residents in the community of Livadi. The community of Livadi covers an area of 140.90 km2 while the respective municipal unit 158.273 km2.

Subdivisions
The municipal unit Livadi is subdivided into the following communities:
 Dolichi
 Livadi

Geography
Livadi borders Pieria regional unit to the northeast, and Kozani regional unit to the northwest.  Livadi is located west of Pythio and Katerini, NNW of Larissa, north of Elassona and southeast of Kozani.

Population

Notable people 
 Giorgakis Olympios (1772–1821), fighter in the Greek War of Independence

References

External links
 Evrymenes on GTP Travel Pages
 The Official Website of the Municipality of Evrymenes

Populated places in Larissa (regional unit)